The principal Bwa language, Eastern Bobo Wule (Buamu, Bwamu), is a Gur language of Burkina Faso. It is one of several closely related languages with the name.

References

Bwa languages (Gur)
Languages of Burkina Faso